The following is a list of notable deaths in April 2020.

Entries for each day are listed alphabetically by surname. A typical entry lists information in the following sequence:
 Name, age, country of citizenship at birth, subsequent country of citizenship (if applicable), reason for notability, cause of death (if known), and reference.

April 2020

1
Tony Anderson, 78, Australian footballer.
Dušan Bartovič, 76, Slovak footballer, 1968 Olympics, Czechoslovak national team.
Anne Hendricks Bass, 78, American investor and philanthropist.
Branislav Blažić, 63, Serbian surgeon and politician, Minister of Environmental Protection (1998–2000), COVID-19.
Peter Brooke, 90, American businessman.
Jaxon Buell, 5, American microhydranencephaly victim.
Zev Buffman, 89, Israeli theatre producer, President and CEO of Ruth Eckerd Hall (2011–2018).
Mario Chaldú, 77, Argentine footballer (Club Atlético Banfield, Racing Club, national team).
Bruce Dawe, 90, Australian poet.
Ricardo Díez Hochleitner, 91, Spanish economist and diplomat, president of the Club of Rome (1991–2000).
David Driskell, 88, American visual artist and academic, COVID-19.
Kevin Duffy, 87, American jurist, Judge of the U.S. District Court for Southern New York (1972–2016), COVID-19.
Bernard Epin, 83, French writer and literary critic, COVID-19.
Ed Farmer, 70, American baseball player (Chicago White Sox, Philadelphia Phillies) and broadcaster, kidney disease.
Edward L. Feightner, 100, American Navy officer and flying ace.
Luiz Flávio Gomes, 62, Brazilian jurist, professor and politician, Deputy (since 2019), leukaemia.
Sir James Learmonth Gowans, 95, British immunologist.
Irving Greenfield, 91, American author.
Nur Hassan Hussein, 82, Somali politician, Prime Minister (2007–2009), COVID-19.
Martin Khor, 68, Malaysian journalist (The Star) and economist, executive director of the South Centre (2009–2018), cancer.
Philippe Malaurie, 95, French lawyer.
Gérard Mannoni, 92, French sculptor.
Ellis Marsalis Jr., 85, American jazz pianist, COVID-19.
Roger Marshall, 86, English screenwriter.
Ronn Matlock, 72, American singer and songwriter.
Rüdiger Nehberg, 84, German human rights activist and survival expert.
Floris Michael Neusüss, 83, German photographer.
Richard Passman, 94, American aeronautical engineer and space scientist, COVID-19.
Dirceu Pinto, 39, Brazilian Paralympic boccia player (2008, 2012, 2016), heart failure.
Bucky Pizzarelli, 94, American jazz guitarist, COVID-19.
Dieter Reith, 82, German pianist and organist.
Harold Rubin, 87, South African-born Israeli jazz clarinettist.
Gerardo Ruiz Esparza, 70, Mexican politician, Secretary of Communications and Transportation (2012–2018), stroke.
Yvonne Schaloske, 68, Swedish actress (Rederiet).
Adam Schlesinger, 52, American musician (Fountains of Wayne, Ivy) and songwriter ("That Thing You Do"), Emmy winner (2012, 2013, 2019), COVID-19.
Amerigo Severini, 88, Italian cyclo-cross cyclist.
John Stanich, 95, American basketball player.
Joe Tanner, 88, American baseball player.
John Tydeman, 84, English radio producer and theatre director.
Dora Werzberg, 99, French nurse and social worker.
Mahmoud Zakzouk, 86, Egyptian academic and politician, Minister of Awqaf (1995–2011).

2
Mike Appleton, 83, British television producer (The Old Grey Whistle Test).
Robert Beck, 83, American modern pentathlete, Olympic bronze medalist (1960) and Pan American champion (1963), complications from a head injury and COVID-19.
Goyo Benito, 73, Spanish footballer (Real Madrid, Rayo Vallecano, national team), COVID-19.
Ranko Borozan, 86, Bosnian footballer (Velež Mostar, Partizan, Red Star Belgrade).
Patricia Bosworth, 86, American actress (The Nun's Story) and author, COVID-19.
John B. Bryant, 72, American economist.
Bernardita Catalla, 62, Filipino diplomat, ambassador to Lebanon (since 2017), COVID-19.
Zaccaria Cometti, 83, Italian footballer (Atalanta), COVID-19.
Oskar Fischer, 97, German politician, Minister for Foreign Affairs of the GDR (1975–1990).
William Frankland, 108, British immunologist, COVID-19.
François de Gaulle, 98, French missionary, COVID-19.
Louis J. Gill, 80, American politician, member of the New Jersey General Assembly (1988–1992).
Juan Giménez, 76, Argentine comic book artist (Heavy Metal, Métal hurlant), COVID-19.
Ron Graham, 93, English-Australian actor (Home and Away, Waterloo Station).
Don Healy, 83, American football player (Chicago Bears, Dallas Cowboys, Buffalo Bills).
Astrid Nøklebye Heiberg, 83, Norwegian politician, MP (1985–1989, since 2013), president of the IFRC (1997–2001).
Gedale B. Horowitz, 87, American banker.
Daniel Jacoby, 86, French lawyer and human rights activist.
Walentyna Janta-Połczyńska, 107, Polish political exile.
Anick Jesdanun, 51, American technology journalist (Associated Press), COVID-19.
Nirmal Singh Khalsa, 67, Indian singer and priest (Darbar Sahib), COVID-19.
Eddie Large, 78, British comedian (Little and Large), heart failure and COVID-19.
João Marcos, 66, Brazilian footballer (Palmeiras, Grêmio), esophageal disease.
Maeve Kennedy McKean, 40, American lawyer, health official and academic, drowning.
James Megellas, 103, American military officer.
Janez Mlinar, 78, Slovenian Olympic skier (1968).
Manolo Navarro, 95, Spanish bullfighter, COVID-19.
Feriha Öz, 87, Turkish academic and pathologist, COVID-19.
Rodrigo Pesántez Rodas, 82, Ecuadorian writer and poet, COVID-19.
Emmitt Peters, 79, American dog musher.
Hans Reiss, 97, German-born Irish academic.
Sergio Rossi, 84, Italian shoe designer (Sergio Rossi), COVID-19.
Aaron Rubashkin, 92, American businessman, patriarch of the Rubashkin family, COVID-19.
Paul Sauvé, 80, Canadian curler.
George Shepperson, 98, British historian.
Shamsur Rahman Sherif, 79, Bangladeshi politician, Minister of Land (2014–2019).
Arnold Sowinski, 89, French footballer (RC Lens), COVID-19.
Claudio Spies, 95, Chilean-born American composer.
Carl Tacy, 87, American college basketball coach (Wake Forest Demon Deacons, Marshall Thundering Herd).
Aptripel Tumimomor, 53, Indonesian politician, Regent of North Morowali (since 2016), COVID-19.
Jan Veentjer, 82, Dutch Olympic field hockey player (1964).
Mel Watkins, 87, Canadian political economist.
Arthur Whistler, 75, American ethnobotanist and author, COVID-19.
Keizo Yamada, 92, Japanese Olympic long-distance runner (1952).
Jacques Yankel, 99, French artist.

3
Yūtokutaishi Akiyama, 85, Japanese engraver and photographer.
Robert Armstrong, Baron Armstrong of Ilminster, 93, British civil servant, Cabinet Secretary (1979–1987) and Lord Temporal (since 1998).
Steven C. Beering, 87, German-born American physician and academic, President of Purdue University (1983–2000).
Karel Beyers, 77, Belgian footballer.
Helin Bölek, 28, Turkish singer (Grup Yorum), starvation following hunger strike.
Arnold Demain, 92, American microbiologist, COVID-19.
Henri Ecochard, 96, French military officer, COVID-19.
Ira Einhorn, 79, American convicted murderer and fugitive.
Giovanni Paolo Gibertini, 97, Italian Roman Catholic prelate, Bishop of Ales-Terralba (1983–1989) and Reggio Emilia-Guastalla (1989–1998).
Bob Glanzer, 74, American politician, member of the South Dakota House of Representatives (since 2017), COVID-19.
Alexander A. Gurshtein, 83, Russian astronomer.
Francisco Hernando Contreras, 74, Spanish housing developer, COVID-19.
Marguerite Lescop, 104, Canadian writer, COVID-19.
George Mackie, 70, Scottish rugby union player (Highland RFC, national team), cancer.
Hans Meyer, 94, South African actor (Colditz).
Janet Mullarney, 68, Irish artist and sculptor.
C. W. Nicol, 79, Welsh-born Japanese writer, cancer.
Yoichi Nishimaru, 93, Japanese physician.
Hans Prade, 81, Surinamese diplomat, COVID-19.
Omar Quintana, 76, Ecuadorian politician and sports executive, President of the National Congress (2005), president of C.S. Emelec, COVID-19.
Marcelle Ranson-Hervé, 90, French actress (Now Where Did the 7th Company Get to?, Robert et Robert), COVID-19.
Francis Robicsek, 94, American cardio-thoracic surgeon.
Tim Robinson, 85, English writer and cartographer, COVID-19.
Joel Shatzky, 76, American writer and literary professor, complications of COVID-19.
Yusuf Kenan Sönmez, 71–72, Turkish politician, MP (1987–1991), COVID-19.
Arlene Stringer-Cuevas, 86, American politician, member of the New York City Council (1976–1977), COVID-19.
Thio Gim Hock, 82, Singaporean Olympic water polo player (1956) and property developer, blood disease and kidney failure.
Albino Trevisan, 89, Italian Olympic rower.
Eric Verdonk, 60, New Zealand rower, Olympic bronze medallist (1988), cancer.
Constand Viljoen, 86, South African general and politician, MP (1994–2001).
Frida Wattenberg, 95, French resistance member, COVID-19.

4
Barry Allen, 74, Canadian rock musician and record producer (Painter).
Jerónimo Arango, 92–93, Mexican businessman (Walmart de México y Centroamérica).
Arminsyah, 59, Indonesian prosecutor, Vice Attorney General (since 2017), traffic collision.
Luis Eduardo Aute, 76, Filipino-born Spanish artist.
Alexander Thynn, 7th Marquess of Bath, 87, English politician and artist, Lord Temporal (1992–1999), COVID-19.
Jay Benedict, 68, American actor (Foyle's War, Double Team, The Dark Knight Rises), COVID-19.
Philippe Bodson, 75, Belgian businessman and politician, Senator (1999–2003), COVID-19.
Violet Brand, 91, English author.
Timothy Brown, 82, American singer, actor (M*A*S*H), and football player (Philadelphia Eagles, Baltimore Colts), complications of dementia.
Carol Burkett, 74, American drag racing driver.
Rafael Leonardo Callejas Romero, 76, Honduran politician, President (1990–1994), cardiac arrest.
Allyson Carlyle, 65, American scholar.
Silvano Carroli, 81, Italian baritone.
Irena Chalmers, 84, British-born American author and food commentator, esophageal cancer.
Forrest Compton, 94, American actor (The Edge of Night, Gomer Pyle, U.S.M.C., The F.B.I.), COVID-19.
Tom Dempsey, 73, American football player (New Orleans Saints, Philadelphia Eagles, Los Angeles Rams), COVID-19.
Shan Deniston, 101, American athlete and sports coach.
George Dweh, 59, Liberian politician and warlord, speaker of the National Transitional Legislative Assembly of Liberia (2003–2005).
Mieczysław Długoborski, 89, Polish Olympic athlete (1952).
Xavier Dor, 91, French embryologist and anti-abortion activist, COVID-19.
Brian Falconer, 86, Australian footballer.
Ken Farnum, 89, Barbadian-born Jamaican Olympic cyclist (1952), COVID-19.
Lila Fenwick, 87, American lawyer and human rights advocate, COVID-19.
Franz Födermayr, 86, Austrian musicologist.
Carlos González-Artigas, 72, Ecuadorian businessman, COVID-19.
James Gooch, 85, American psychiatrist and psychoanalyst.
Bashirul Haq, 77, Bangladeshi architect.
Alex Harvey, 79, American singer, songwriter and actor (Gettysburg, Fire Down Below, The Rainmaker).
Arnold Heertje, 86, Dutch economist.
Włodzimierz Klonowski, 75, Polish biomedical physicist.
Volodymyr Korolyuk, 94, Ukrainian mathematician.
Carlo Leva, 90, Italian production designer and set decorator (The Cat o' Nine Tails), heart attack.
Vincent Lionti, 60, American violist and conductor, COVID-19.
Leïla Menchari, 92, Tunisian decorator and designer (Hermès), COVID-19.
Andrea Mitchell, 64, Australian politician, WA MLA (2008–2017), heart condition.
Olan Montgomery, 56, American actor (Stranger Things) and pop artist, COVID-19.
Marcel Moreau, 86, Belgian writer, COVID-19.
Jerrold Mundis, 79, American author and speaker, complications from COVID-19.
Pertti Paasio, 81, Finnish politician, Minister of Foreign Affairs (1989–1991) and MP (1975–1979, 1982–1996).
Susanna Ramel, 100, Swedish actress.
Rao Pingru, 97, Chinese comic book author (Our Story: A Memoir of Love and Life in China), multiple organ failure.
Arlene Schnitzer, 91, American art collector and philanthropist.
Anton Sebastianpillai, 75, Sri Lankan born British geriatrician and author, COVID-19.
Muhammad Sirajul Islam, 77, Bangladeshi politician, MP (1973–1982), COVID-19.
Victor Skrebneski, 90, American photographer, cancer.
Börje Stattin, 90, Swedish Olympic gymnast (1952).
Harland Svare, 89, American football player and coach (New York Giants, Los Angeles Rams), respiratory arrest.
Founéké Sy, 33, Malian footballer (Korofina, Sanat Naft, national team), traffic collision.
Ivan Vakarchuk, 73, Ukrainian physicist, Minister of Education and Science (2007–2010) and rector of the University of Lviv (1990–2007, 2010–2013).
Peter Vaughan, 89, British Anglican clergyman, Bishop of Ramsbury (1989–1998).
Ezio Vendrame, 72, Italian footballer (Lanerossi Vicenza, Napoli, Padova) and writer, cancer.
Cheryl Wall, 71, American literary critic.
Michel Wiblé, 97, Swiss composer and teacher.
Mohammad Ali Younes, Lebanese spy, head of Hezbollah's counter espionage unit, shot.

5
Michel Andrault, 93, French architect (Tours Société Générale, AccorHotels Arena).
Ray Authement, 91, American academic administrator, President of the University of Louisiana at Lafayette (1974–2008).
Ed Biles, 88, American football coach (Houston Oilers), leukemia.
Honor Blackman, 94, English actress (The Avengers, Goldfinger, Jason and the Argonauts).
Margaret Burbidge, 100, British-born American astronomer, complications from a fall.
Jocelyn Burton, 74, British silver and goldsmith, bowel cancer.
Gregory W. Carman, 83, American politician and jurist, U.S. representative (1981–1983), Judge (since 1983) and Chief Judge (1996–2003) of the U.S. Court of International Trade.
André Cristol, 77, French footballer (Montpellier, Limoges).
Shirley Douglas, 86, Canadian actress (Wind at My Back, Lolita, Barney's Great Adventure) and civil rights activist, complications from pneumonia.
Barry Downs, 89, Australian Olympic sports shooter (1968).
Ronnie Earle, 78, American politician and judge, Texas state representative (1973–1976).
Svein Ellingsen, 90, Norwegian hymnist and visual artist.
Ben Elliott, 67, American audio engineer (Pure Rock Fury, Masters of War) and record producer, complications from cancer.
Jun Factoran, 76, Filipino lawyer and politician, Secretary of Environment and Natural Resources (1987–1992).
Lee Fierro, 91, American actress (Jaws), COVID-19.
James S. Gracey, 92, American admiral.
Daniel Greene, 86, American artist.
Bob Hermann, 97, American Hall of Fame soccer executive, president and founder of the NASL, owner of the St. Louis Stars, namesake of Hermann Trophy and Hermann Stadium.
Ray Hiron, 76, English footballer (Portsmouth, Reading).
Ivan Itkin, 84, American politician, member of the Pennsylvania House of Representatives (1973–1998), heart failure.
Mahmoud Jibril, 67, Libyan politician, Minister of Foreign Affairs and Prime Minister (2011), COVID-19.
Tom Larkin, 88–89, Irish hurler (Tipperary).
Sir John Laws, 74, English jurist, High Court Judge (1992–1998) and Lord Justice of Appeal (1999–2016), sepsis and COVID-19.
Pentti Linkola, 87, Finnish deep ecologist and writer.
John Lucas, 90, English philosopher.
Bobby Mitchell, 84, American Hall of Fame football player (Cleveland Browns, Washington Redskins) and executive.
Dougie Morgan, 73, Scottish rugby union player (Stewart's Melville, British and Irish Lions, national team).
George Ogilvie, 89, Australian theatre and film director (Mad Max Beyond Thunderdome), cardiac arrest.
Michel Parisse, 83, French historian and professor, COVID-19.
John A. Shaw, 81, American civil servant, heart failure.
Donald Simpson, 77, American librarian, president of the Center for Research Libraries (1980–1999).
Agop Terzan, 92, French-Armenian astronomer.
André Verroken, 80, Belgian furniture designer and interior architect.
Peter Walker, 84, English cricketer (Glamorgan, national team), stroke.

6
Radomir Antić, 71, Serbian football player (Partizan) and manager (Atlético Madrid, national team), pancreatitis.
M. K. Arjunan, 84, Indian composer.
Helène Aylon, 89, American ecofeminist artist, COVID-19.
Claude Barthélemy, 74, Haitian footballer (Detroit Cougars, national team).
Roger Beatty, 87, American director, screenwriter and stage manager (The Carol Burnett Show, Mama's Family, The Billion Dollar Hobo), prostate cancer.
Josep Maria Benet i Jornet, 79, Spanish playwright and screenwriter, COVID-19.
Black the Ripper, 32, British grime MC, rapper and cannabis activist, heart attack.
Marcel Boillat, 90, Swiss political activist.
Colleen Callaghan, 89, American makeup artist (A Beautiful Mind, The Curious Case of Benjamin Button, Chicago).
Pat Capponi, 70, Canadian writer and mental health advocate, assisted suicide.
Marc Chardonnens, 59–60, Swiss government official, Director of the Federal Office for the Environment (2016–2020).
Alfonso Cortina, 76, Spanish businessman, chairman and CEO of Repsol YPF (1996–2004), COVID-19.
John Dossetor, 94, Indian-born Canadian physician.
James Drury, 85, American actor (The Virginian, Forbidden Planet, The Young Warriors).
Jock Edwards, 64, New Zealand cricketer (Central Districts, national team).
Armando Francioli, 100, Italian actor (The Pharaohs' Woman, The Opium Den, Hawk of the Caribbean).
Ferenc Füzesi, 59, Hungarian Olympic handball player (1992).
James Garbutt, 94, English actor (When the Boat Comes In, Superman, The Onedin Line).
Gerhard Giebisch, 93, Austrian-born American physiologist.
Bruce Gonsalves, 63, Australian footballer.
Earl G. Graves Sr., 85, American entrepreneur and businessman, founder of Black Enterprise.
Sergio Guenza, 87, Italian football player (Lazio) and manager (women's national team).
Onaje Allan Gumbs, 70, American pianist.
Vic Henley, 57, American comedian, pulmonary embolism.
Jack Hill, 75, American politician, member of the Georgia State Senate (since 1991).
Stig Holmqvist, 84, Finnish footballer (HIFK Helsinki, HJK Helsinki, national team).
Al Kaline, 85, American Hall of Fame baseball player, broadcaster and executive (Detroit Tigers).
Brahm Kanchibhotla, 66, Indian-American journalist, COVID-19.
Jacques Le Brun, 88, French historian, COVID-19.
Claude Le Pen, 72, French economist.
Quenton Leach, 47, Australian footballer (Fremantle), cancer.
Jean Little, 88, Canadian writer (Mine for Keeps, From Anna, Orphan at My Door).
Adlin Mair-Clarke, 78, Jamaican Olympic athlete (1964, 1968), complications from COVID-19.
Mary McPartlan, 65, Irish singer, musician and producer.
Trevor Platt, 77, British marine scientist.
William R. Polk, 91, American foreign policy consultant and author, leukemia.
Bullet Prakash, 44, Indian comedian and actor (Mast Maja Maadi, Aithalakkadi, Aryan), liver failure.
Jayantha Rathnayake, 51, Sri Lankan musician, cancer.
Lucien Schmitthäusler, 85, French writer.
James F. Scott, 77, American physicist.
Yvonne Sherwell, 92, American actress and dancer, COVID-19.
Fred Singer, 95, Austrian-born American physicist.
Mark Steiner, 77, American philosopher, COVID-19.
Jock Steven, 84, Scottish rugby union player (Barbarians).
Eugene Stowe, 97, American Church of the Nazarene minister and general superintendent.
Stephen Sulyk, 95, Polish-born American Ukrainian Catholic hierarch, Archbishop of Philadelphia (1980–2000), COVID-19.
Riay Tatary, 72, Syrian-born Spanish doctor and imam, president of Islamic Commission of Spain (since 1992), COVID-19.
Naek L. Tobing, 79, Indonesian physician and sexologist, COVID-19.
Eli Velder, 94, American academic.
Tim White, 68, British painter.

7
Albert Almoznino, 97, Israeli hand shadow artist.
Betty Bennett, 98, American jazz and big band singer.
Christian Bonnet, 98, French politician, Minister of the Interior (1977–1981).
Roger Chappot, 79, Swiss Olympic ice hockey player (1964), COVID-19.
Robert Chaudenson, 82, French Creole linguist, COVID-19.
Jim Clarko, 87, Australian politician, WA MLA (1974–1996).
Jean-Laurent Cochet, 85, French stage director and actor (A Thousand Billion Dollars, Fort Saganne), COVID-19.
Peter Cory, 94, Canadian judge, Puisne Justice of the Supreme Court of Canada (1989–1999).
Faith Dane, 96, American actress (Gypsy) and politician.
Hutch Davie, 89, American pianist, arranger and composer.
Eddy Davis, 79, American musician and bandleader, COVID-19.
Claire Deluca, 86, French actress and theatre director.
Fariborz Esmaeili, 79, Iranian Olympic footballer (1964).
Steve Farmer, 71, American musician (The Amboy Dukes) and songwriter ("Journey to the Center of the Mind").
Charlotte Figi, 13, American medical cannabidiol patient and reform figure, namesake of Charlotte's web cannabis, seizure.
Jacques Frémontier, 89, French journalist and television producer.
Allen Garfield, 80, American actor (The Conversation, Nashville, Beverly Hills Cop II), COVID-19.
Henry Graff, 98, American historian, COVID-19.
Leib Groner, 88, American Chabad-Lubavitch Rabbi and secretary to Menachem Schneerson, COVID-19.
Irene Hirano, 71, American non-profit executive, president of U.S.-Japan Council (since 2009) and the Japanese American National Museum (2008–2012).
Norman Holwell, 91, British speed skater (1952).
Hudeidi, 91, Somali oud player, COVID-19.
M. A. Jabbar, 80, Bangladeshi politician, MP (2008–2014).
Monica Jackson, 99, Scottish mountaineer.
Sasi Kalinga, 59, Indian actor (Paleri Manikyam: Oru Pathirakolapathakathinte Katha, Pranchiyettan & the Saint, Indian Rupee), liver disease.
Mishik Kazaryan, 72, Russian physicist, COVID-19.
Jan Křen, 89, Czech historian, academic and dissident, Charter 77 signatory, COVID-19.
John Percy Leon Lewis, 77, Guyanese military officer, COVID-19.
Fred Mandeville, 97, Canadian politician.
John Matias, 75, American baseball player (Chicago White Sox).
Roger Matthews, 71, British criminologist, COVID-19.
Thomas Mensah, 87, Ghanaian judge.
Amira Nur al-Din, 94–95, Iraqi poet.
Yaakov Perlow, 89, American Novominsk rebbe, president of Agudah, COVID-19.
John Prine, 73, American singer-songwriter ("Sam Stone", "Angel from Montgomery"), Grammy winner (1992, 2006), COVID-19.
Jawdat Al-Qazwini, 67, Iraqi scholar.
Nipper Read, 95, British police officer and boxing administrator, COVID-19.
Jan Reijnen, 93, Dutch politician, mayor of Wervershoof (1964–1969), Oldenzaal (1969–1976) and Heerlen (1976–1986), Senator (1972–1977).
Donato Sabia, 56, Italian Olympic middle-distance runner (1984, 1988), COVID-19.
Julie Sauvé, 67, Canadian swimming coach.
Harv Schmidt, 83, American college basketball player and coach (Illinois Fighting Illini).
Tom Scully, 89, Irish Gaelic football manager (Offaly), COVID-19.
Barbara Smoker, 96, British humanist activist, president of the National Secular Society (1972–1996).
George A. Snow, 96, Canadian politician, complications from pneumonia.
Herb Stempel, 93, American game show contestant (Twenty-One), whistleblower in the 1950s quiz show scandals.
Adrian V. Stokes, 74, British computer scientist and disability campaigner.
André Stordeur, 79, Belgian electronic musician.
Miguel Ángel Tábet, 78, Venezuelan theologian and exegete, COVID-19.
Joaquim Tosas, 73–74, Spanish politician and engineer, president of Port of Barcelona (1996–2004), COVID-19.
Domingo Villanueva, 55, Filipino Olympic cyclist (1988, 1992).
Ian Willmore, 61, British politician and activist, heart attack.
Hal Willner, 64, American music producer (Saturday Night Live, Stay Awake), COVID-19.

8
Siri Berg, 98, Swedish-born American abstract artist.
Tom Blackwell, 82, American artist, COVID-19.
Richard L. Brodsky, 73, American lawyer and politician, member of the New York State Assembly (1983–2010), heart attack.
Dirk van den Broek, 96, Dutch supermarket founder.
L. Carl Brown, 91, American historian.
Jaroslava Brychtová, 95, Czech glass artist.
Aubrey Burl, 93, British archaeologist.
Boško Bursać, 74, Bosnian footballer (Rijeka, Vitesse Arnhem, NK Zagreb).
Robert L. Carroll, 81, American-Canadian palaeontologist, COVID-19.
Keith Critchlow, 87, British artist and professor of architecture.
Carl Dobkins Jr., 79, American singer ("My Heart Is an Open Book").
John Downing, 79, Welsh photojournalist, cancer.
Jackie du Preez, 77, Zimbabwean cricketer (Rhodesia, South Africa).
Peter Ecklund, 74, American jazz cornetist, complications from Parkinson's disease.
Madeleine Fischer, 84, Swiss-born Italian actress (Le Amiche, The Bachelor, The Day the Sky Exploded).
Martin S. Fox, 95, American publisher, COVID-19.
Glenn Fredly, 44, Indonesian singer, meningitis.
Norah Gibbons, 67, Irish children's rights activist.
Bjørn Haug, 91, Norwegian jurist.
Hiphei, 82, Indian politician, MP (1990–2002).
John Hughes, 66, Canadian ice hockey player (Cincinnati Stingers).
Abdul Momin Imambari, 89–90, Bangladeshi Islamic scholar and politician.
Miguel Jones, 81, Equatoguinean-born Spanish footballer (Barakaldo, Indautxu, Atlético Madrid), COVID-19.
Bernie Juskiewicz, 77, American politician, member of the Vermont House of Representatives (2013–2019), COVID-19.
Lois Kelly Miller, 102, Jamaican actress (Meet Joe Black).
Joel J. Kupperman, 83, American philosopher, complications from COVID-19.
Paul Lambert, 61, British television and media producer, suicide.
Francesco La Rosa, 93, Italian footballer (Pro Patria, Palermo, national team), COVID-19.
Ted Leverenz, 78, American politician, Illinois state representative (1975–1991) and State Senator (1991–1993).
Lars-Eric Lundvall, 86, Swedish ice hockey player (Frölunda), world champion (1962) and Olympic silver medallist (1964).
François Luc Macosso, 81, Congolese politician.
Henri Madelin, 83, French Jesuit theologian and editor, COVID-19.
Rick May, 79, Canadian-American voice actor (Team Fortress 2, Star Fox, Sly 3: Honor Among Thieves), COVID-19.
David Méresse, 89, French footballer (CO Roubaix-Tourcoing, FC Sète 34).
Valeriu Muravschi, 70, Moldovan politician, Prime Minister (1991–1992), Minister of Finance (1990–1991) and MP (1998–2001).
Norman I. Platnick, 68, American arachnologist and curator (American Museum of Natural History).
Robert Poujade, 91, French politician, Deputy (1967–1981, 1986–2002) and mayor of Dijon (1971–2001).
Toni Rettaliata, 75, American politician, member of the New York State Assembly (1979–1987).
John A. Rocco, 83, American politician, member of the New Jersey General Assembly (1980–1998), mayor of Cherry Hill, New Jersey (1975–1977), respiratory failure.
Chynna Rogers, 25, American rapper, drug overdose.
Larry Sherman, American house music publisher, founder of Trax Records, heart failure.
Pat Stapleton, 79, Canadian ice hockey player (Chicago Blackhawks, Boston Bruins), stroke.
Nicholas Temperley, 87, English-born American musicologist.
Linda Tripp, 70, American civil servant and whistleblower (Clinton–Lewinsky scandal), pancreatic cancer.
Te Huirangi Waikerepuru, 91, New Zealand trade unionist and Māori language activist.
Albert H. Wilkening, 74, American major general, cancer.

9
Torvild Aakvaag, 93, Norwegian businessman, CEO of Norsk Hydro (1984–1991).
Sufia Ahmed, 87, Bangladeshi academic, cardiac arrest.
Reggie Bagala, 54, American politician, member of the Louisiana House of Representatives (since 2020), COVID-19.
Dame Jocelyn Barrow, 90, British educator, community activist and politician.
Leila Benitez-McCollum, 89, Filipino-American television and radio host (Student Canteen), COVID-19.
Daniel Bernard, 70, French footballer (Rennes, Paris Saint-Germain, Brest).
Jim Bolger, 88, American baseball player (Chicago Cubs).
Frank J. Brown, 63–64, American visual artist.
Tom Bruce, 67, American swimmer, 1972 Olympic gold and silver medallist.
Jacques Calvet, 88, French businessman, CEO of Groupe PSA.
Denise Coia, 67, Scottish psychiatrist.
Jim Conacher, 98, Scottish-born Canadian ice hockey player (New York Rangers, Chicago Black Hawks).
Elizabeth de la Porte, 78, British harpsichordist.
Surésh Dhargalkar, 85, British architect.
Malcolm Dixon, 85, English actor (Time Bandits, Return of the Jedi, Flash Gordon).
Mort Drucker, 91, American caricaturist and comics artist (Mad).
Marc Engels, 54, Belgian sound engineer (The Odyssey, I'm Dead but I Have Friends), COVID-19.
Mark Golden, 71, Canadian historian.
Harvey Goldstein, 80, British statistician and academic, COVID-19.
Andy González, 69, American jazz and Latin dance bassist.
Simplice Guédet Manzela, 71, Gabonese politician.
Clément-Joseph Hannouche, 70, Egyptian Syriac Catholic hierarch, Bishop of Cairo (since 1995).
Ho Kam-ming, 94, Macanese-born Canadian martial artist, COVID-19.
Zdeněk Jičínský, 91, Czech lawyer and politician, Deputy (1996–2002, 2003–2010).
Jay K. Katzen, 83, American politician and bureaucrat, member of the Virginia House of Delegates (1994–2002).
Theresa M. Korn, 94, American engineer and pilot, COVID-19.
Heino Kurvet, 78, Soviet-Estonian spring canoer, 1971 World Championships bronze medallist.
Vladimir Lefebvre, 83, Soviet-American mathematical psychologist.
Phyllis Lyon, 95, American gay rights activist.
Liliane Marchais, 84, French political activist.
Jacqueline Mason, 84, Australian pair skater.
Virginia Savage McAlester, 76, American architectural historian, myelfibrosis.
Guy Miserque, 74, Belgian Olympic field hockey player (1964, 1968, 1972, 1976).
Naoki Murata, 70, Japanese judoka, heart failure.
Lee Nurse, 43, English cricketer (Berkshire), COVID-19.
Gern Nagler, 88, American football player (Chicago Cardinals, Cleveland Browns).
Vitor Sapienza, 86, Brazilian politician and economist, COVID-19.
Christopher Schmitt, 45, American web designer and author.
Ida Schuster, 101, Scottish actress (Death Watch, A Shot at Glory).
Ernst-Georg Schwill, 81, German actor (Alarm in the Circus, A Berlin Romance, The Shield and the Sword).
Junzo Sekine, 93, Japanese Hall of Fame baseball player (Osaka Kintetsu Buffaloes, Yomiuri Giants) and manager (Yakult Swallows).
Dmitri Smirnov, 71, Russian-born British composer (Tiriel, The Lamentations of Thel), COVID-19.
Jean-Pierre St-Louis, 68–69, Canadian photographic director and videographer (Requiem for a Handsome Bastard, Whoever Dies, Dies in Pain).
Richard Teitelbaum, 80, American electronic music composer, stroke.
Taufiq Tirmizi, 59, Pakistani cricketer (House Building Finance Corporation, Karachi Whites).
Saul Turteltaub, 87, American television writer and producer (That Girl, Sanford and Son, What's Happening!!).
Phyllis Wallbank, 101, British educationalist.
Won Pyong-oh, 90, South Korean ornithologist.
Jim Youel, 98, American football player (Washington Redskins).

10
Mike Auret, 83, Zimbabwean-Irish farmer and politician.
Bruce Baillie, 88, American filmmaker (Castro Street).
Dov Ben-Dov, 93, Israeli Olympic sports shooter (1952).
Julio Blanco, 82, Cuban footballer (FC Industriales, national team).
Big George Brock, 87, American blues harmonicist and singer.
Olga Bucătaru, 78, Romanian actress, heart attack.
Antonio Carro Martínez, 96, Spanish politician, Minister of the Presidency (1974–1975), member of the Congress of Deputies (1982–1989).
Rifat Chadirji, 93, Iraqi architect, COVID-19.
David Cohen, 102, American soldier, COVID-19.
Oscar Cohen, 91, American music business executive and agent.
Lucie Dolène, 88, Syrian-born French actress and singer.
Walter D'Souza, 93, Indian cricketer (Gujarat).
Mary Jane Fate, 86, American Athabaskan tribal leader.
Nicholas Fernando, 87, Sri Lankan Roman Catholic prelate, Archbishop of Colombo (1977–2002).
Frits Flinkevleugel, 80, Dutch footballer (national team, FC Amsterdam, DWS).
Samuel Hargress II, 84, American bar owner, COVID-19.
Shanti Hiranand, 87, Indian classical singer.
Ceybil Jefferies, American house and R&B singer ("It's Gonna Be Alright"), COVID-19. (death announced on this day)
Teijo Khan, 64, American professional wrestler (AWA).
Ronald J. Kurth, 88, American rear admiral, government expert on Russian policy and study.
K. Gordon Lark, 89, American biologist, prostate cancer.
Marianne Lundquist, 88, Swedish Olympic swimmer (1948, 1952), COVID-19.
Jymie Merritt, 93, American jazz bassist (The Jazz Messengers), liver cancer.
Enrique Múgica, 88, Spanish lawyer and politician, Minister of Justice (1988–1991), Deputy (1977–2000) and Ombudsman (2000–2010), COVID-19.
Bas Mulder, 88, Dutch-Surinamese priest, COVID-19.
Nobuhiko Obayashi, 82, Japanese film director (House, Toki o Kakeru Shōjo, Hanagatami), screenwriter and editor, lung cancer.
Jacob Plange-Rhule, 62, Ghanaian physician, Rector of the Ghana College of Physicians and Surgeons (since 2015), COVID-19.
Marcel Rainaud, 80, French politician, Senator (2006–2014).
Marke Raines, 93, Canadian politician, MP (1974–1979).
Pete Retzlaff, 88, American football player and executive (Philadelphia Eagles).
Francis Reusser, 77, Swiss film director (The Big Night, Derborence, War in the Highlands).
Diane Rodriguez, 68, American actress (Terminator 2: Judgment Day, La Bamba), cancer.
Cecil C. Rousseau, 82, American mathematician and author.
Carlo Sabatini, 88, Italian actor (Strangled Lives) and voice actor.
Ing Yoe Tan, 71, Dutch politician, Senator (1999–2011).
Abigail Thernstrom, 83, American political scientist.
Hans Verhagen, 81, Dutch journalist, poet and painter.
Roy Watson, 86, Australian cricketer (Western Australia).
Tom Webster, 71, Canadian ice hockey player (Detroit Red Wings, New England Whalers) and coach (Los Angeles Kings), brain cancer.
Alf Wood, 74, English footballer (Shrewsbury Town, Millwall).
Iris M. Zavala, 83, Puerto Rican author, independence activist and intellectual, COVID-19.

11
Philip Appleman, 94, American poet and writer.
Mel Baggs, 39, American autism blogger.
Simon Barrington-Ward, 89, English Anglican clergyman, Bishop of Coventry (1985–1997), COVID-19.
Michael Bowden, 73, Australian footballer (Richmond), motor neurone disease.
Colby Cave, 25, Canadian ice hockey player (Boston Bruins, Edmonton Oilers), complications from intracerebral hemorrhage.
Hélène Châtelain, 84, Belgian-born French actress (La Jetée), documentary film director and writer.
Stanley Chera, 77, American real estate executive, COVID-19.
Bo Christensen, 82, Danish film producer.
John Horton Conway, 82, English mathematician (Conway's Game of Life, surreal numbers, monstrous moonshine), COVID-19.
Justus Dahinden, 94, Swiss architect, teacher and writer.
Mariano De Nicolò, 88, Italian Roman Catholic prelate, Bishop of San Marino-Montefeltro (1989–1995) and Rimini (1989–2007).
Murray Dorin, 65, Canadian politician.
Gerald Glenn, 66, American pastor, COVID-19.
Paul Haddad, 56, English-born Canadian actor (Babar, John Callahan's Quads!, Resident Evil 2), throat cancer.
Alfred Hagn, 72, German Olympic alpine skier (1968, 1972).
Wynn Handman, 97, American artistic director (The American Place Theatre), COVID-19.
Margot Hartman, 86, American actress (The Curse of the Living Corpse, Violent Midnight, Voyage to the Planet of Prehistoric Women).
Kristin Jacobs, 60, American politician, mayor of Broward County (2012–2013) and member of the Florida House of Representatives (since 2014), colon cancer.
Ezekiel Kalipeni, 66, Malawian geographer.
Edem Kodjo, 81, Togolese politician, Prime Minister (1994–1996, 2005–2006) and Chairperson of the African Union Commission (1978–1983).
Periklis Korovesis, 78, Greek journalist and politician, MP (2007–2009).
Linda Larason, 72, American politician, complications from multiple myeloma.
Liu Dehai, 82, Chinese pipa player.
Ruth Mandel, 81, Austrian-born American political scientist, women's advocate and Holocaust survivor, ovarian cancer.
Might and Power, 26, New Zealand-bred Australian racehorse, Melbourne Cup (1997), Caulfield Cup (1997) and W. S. Cox Plate (1998) winner.
Muid Latif, 41, Malaysian fashion designer.
Garth Owen-Smith, 76, Namibian environmentalist, cancer.
Luciano Pellicani, 81, Italian sociologist and journalist.
Lenore L. Prather, 88, American jurist, Justice (1982–2001) and Chief Justice (1998–2001) of the Supreme Court of Mississippi.
Lowell A. Reed Jr., 89, American jurist, Judge of the U.S. District Court for East Pennsylvania (since 1988), complications from Parkinson's disease.
Gus Rodríguez, 61, Mexican writer, director and video game journalist, lung cancer.
Francis Tombs, Baron Tombs, 95, English industrialist and politician, member of the House of Lords (1990–2015).
Alojz Uran, 75, Slovenian Roman Catholic prelate, Auxiliary Bishop (1992–2004) and Archbishop of Ljubljana (2004–2009).
Mansukh C. Wani, 95, Indian-born American organic chemist.
Arne Wilhelmsen, 90, Norwegian businessman, co-founder of Royal Caribbean Cruises.
Gillian Wise, 84, British artist.

12
Farouk Abu Issa, 86, Sudanese politician, Minister of Foreign Affairs (1969–1971).
Francisco Aritmendi, 81, Spanish Olympic long-distance runner (1964), International Cross Country Champion (1964), COVID-19.
Brian Arrowsmith, 79, English football player (Barrow) and manager, COVID-19.
Eliyahu Bakshi-Doron, 78, Israeli rabbi and convicted fraudster, Rishon LeZion (1993–2003), COVID-19.
Camillo Ballin, 75, Italian Roman Catholic prelate, Apostolic Vicar of Northern Arabia (since 2001).
Maurice Barrier, 87, French actor and comedian (The Tall Blond Man with One Black Shoe, Les Compères, Les Fugitifs), COVID-19.
Victor Batista Falla, 87, Cuban publisher and editor, COVID-19.
Claude Beauchamp, 80, Canadian journalist, publisher and political activist.
Glenn Beckert, 79, American baseball player (Chicago Cubs, San Diego Padres).
Mary Begoña, 95, Spanish vedette and actress.
Axel Berg, 81, Norwegian footballer.
Elisabeth Berge, 65, Norwegian businesswoman and civil servant.
Peter Bonetti, 78, English footballer (Chelsea, Dundee United, national team), world champion (1966).
Tim Brooke-Taylor, 79, English comedian (The Goodies) and panellist (I'm Sorry I Haven't a Clue), COVID-19.
Daniel Camiade, 80, French rugby union player (US Quillan, national team).
Chung Won-shik, 91, South Korean politician, Prime Minister (1991–1992), kidney disease.
Jacques De Decker, 74, Belgian writer and author.
Louis van Dijk, 78, Dutch pianist, cancer.
Ted Evans, 79, Australian public servant, Secretary of the Department of the Treasury (1993–2001).
Toussaint Fouda, 61, Cameroonian Olympic road cyclist (1980).
Caro Fraser, 67, British novelist, cancer.
Jim Frey, 88, American baseball manager (Kansas City Royals, Chicago Cubs).
Keiji Fujiwara, 55, Japanese voice actor (Fullmetal Alchemist, Death Note, Attack on Titan), cancer.
Danny Goldman, 80, American actor (The Smurfs, M*A*S*H, Young Frankenstein), stroke.
Sascha Hupmann, 49, German basketball player (Evansville Aces, Panathinaikos, national team), ataxia.
Tarvaris Jackson, 36, American football player (Minnesota Vikings, Seattle Seahawks, Buffalo Bills), traffic collision.
Mikko Kaasalainen, 55, Finnish mathematician.
Lyle Kahl, 80, Canadian educator and politician.
James F. Keane,  85, American politician.
Bill Langille, 76, Canadian politician, MLA (1999–2006), liver cancer.
Adrian Lucaci, 53, Romanian footballer (Sportul Studențesc București).
Abdul Majed, Bangladeshi military officer and convicted murderer (Jail Killing), execution by hanging.
André Manaranche, 93, French Jesuit priest and theologian, COVID-19.
Jacques Maury, 99, French pastor.
Boo McLee, 36, American football player (Wheeling Wildcats).
Rubén Menini, 96, Argentine basketball player (1948, 1952).
Gavin Menzies, 82, British submarine lieutenant commander and author.
Charles Miossec, 81, French politician, Deputy (1978–2002).
Sir Stirling Moss, 90, British Hall of Fame racing driver.
Jon Ola Norbom, 96, Norwegian economist and politician, leader of the Young Liberals (1950–1952) and Minister of Finance (1972–1973).
Joe Pedicino, 70, American professional wrestling ring announcer (WCW).
Ahfazur Rahman, 78, Pakistani journalist.
Joel M. Reed, 86, American film director, producer and screenwriter (The G.I. Executioner, Blood Sucking Freaks, Night of the Zombies), COVID-19.
Jaime Ruiz Sacristán, 70, Mexican business executive, chairman of the Mexican Stock Exchange (since 2015), COVID-19.
Doug Sanders, 86, American professional golfer.
Milton Schafer, 99, American composer.
Carlos Seco Serrano, 96, Spanish historian, COVID-19.
Charles Alexander Shaw, 75, American jurist, Judge of the U.S. District Court for Eastern Missouri (since 1993).
Vasily Sidorov, 75, Russian diplomat, Permanent Representative to the United Nations Office at Geneva (1997–2001).
Khalif Mumin Tohow, Somali justice minister of Hirshabelle State, COVID-19.
Josephat Torner, 42, Tanzanian albino activist, traffic collision.
Samuel Wembé, 73, Cameroonian businessman and politician, COVID-19.
Dennis Yamada, 75, American politician, member of the Hawaii House of Representatives (1971–1983).
Yu Mingfang, 92, Chinese engineer.

13
Baldiri Alavedra, 76, Spanish footballer (Sabadell), COVID-19.
Gil Bailey, 84, Jamaican radio broadcaster, COVID-19.
William H. Bailey, 89, American artist.
Jacques Blamont, 93, French astrophysicist.
E. S. Campbell, 98, American soldier (World War II).
David Corbett, 79, English footballer (Swindon Town, Plymouth Argyle).
Juan Cotino, 70, Spanish businessman and politician, President of Valencian Courts (2011–2014) and Director General of the National Police (1996–2002), COVID-19.
John Dennis, 88, British prelate, Bishop of Knaresborough (1979–1986) and St Edmundsbury and Ipswich (1986–1996).
Ashok Desai, 77, Indian lawyer, Attorney General (1996–1998) and Solicitor General (1989–1990).
Alain Duret, 84, French writer.
Jens Erik Fenstad, 84, Norwegian mathematician, COVID-19.
David Giralt, 60, Cuban Olympic long jump athlete (1980).
Jerry Givens, 67, American chief executioner of Virginia (1982–1999) and anti-death penalty advocate, COVID-19.
Glenna Goodacre, 80, American sculptor (Sacagawea dollar, Vietnam Women's Memorial).
Barbara Gorgoń, 84, Polish Olympic luger (1964).
Karen Harper, 75, American author.
Charlie Harrison, 70, American college basketball coach (East Carolina, New Mexico).
U Pannya Jota Mahathera, 64, Bangladeshi Theravada Buddhist monk, cardiac arrest.
Suad Karajica, 60, Bosnian Olympic luger (1984).
Ryo Kawasaki, 73, Japanese jazz fusion guitarist and composer.
Shay Keogh, 85, Irish footballer (Shamrock Rovers).
Thomas Kunz, 81, American zoologist, COVID-19.
Landelino Lavilla, 85, Spanish politician, President of the Congress of Deputies (1979–1982), Minister of Justice (1976–1979) and member of the Council of State (since 1983).
Philippe Lécrivain, 78, French Catholic priest (Society of Jesus), COVID-19.
Benjamin Levin, 93, Israeli partisan and Holocaust survivor, COVID-19.
Peter Madden, 85, English football player (Rotherham United) and manager (Darlington, Rochdale).
Vicente Magsaysay, 80, Filipino politician, Governor of Zambales (1968–1986, 1998–2007).
Sarah Maldoror, 90, French documentary film director (Sambizanga), COVID-19.
Patricia Millardet, 63, French actress (La Boum 2, P'tit Con, La piovra), heart attack.
Moraes Moreira, 72, Brazilian guitarist and singer (Novos Baianos), heart attack.
Dennis G. Peters, 82, American electrochemist, COVID-19.
Avrohom Pinter, 71, British rabbi and politician, Hackney Borough councillor (1982–1990), COVID-19.
M. V. Rajasekharan, 91, Indian politician, MP.
John Rowlands, 73, English footballer (Stockport County, Barrow, Workington), COVID-19.
Javier Santamaría, 69, Spanish politician, Senator (2011–2015), president of the Segovia province (2003–2011) and mayor of Abades (1991–1996), COVID-19.
Zafar Sarfraz, 50, Pakistani cricketer (Peshawar), COVID-19.
Lansdale Ghiselin Sasscer Jr., 93, American politician.
Bernard Stalter, 63, French entrepreneur and politician, member of the Regional Council of Grand Est (since 2016) and the ESEC (since 2015), COVID-19.
Peggy Sullivan, 90, American librarian, president of the American Library Association (1980–1981).
Ann Sullivan, 91, American animator (The Lion King, The Little Mermaid, Atlantis: The Lost Empire), COVID-19.

14
Pip Baker, 91, British screenwriter (Doctor Who), complications from a fall.
Haydar Baş, 73, Turkish politician, founder and leader of the Independent Turkey Party (since 2002), COVID-19.
Paul Bayvel, 71, South African rugby union player (Transvaal, national team), cancer.
Nate Brooks, 86, American boxer, Olympic champion (1952).
John Collins, 71, Welsh footballer (Portsmouth, Halifax Town, Barnsley).
Helen Damico, 89, Greek-born American literary scholar, COVID-19.
Miguel Ángel D'Annibale, 61, Argentine Roman Catholic prelate, Bishop of Río Gallegos (2013–2018) and San Martín (since 2018), leukaemia.
Danny Delaney, Irish Gaelic footballer (Laois, Stradbally), COVID-19.
Joan Dewhirst, 84–85, British figure skater.
Mario Donatone, 86, Italian actor (Phenomena, The Godfather Part III, John Wick: Chapter 2).
Sir Roger Du Boulay, 98, British diplomat.
Akin Euba, 84, Nigerian musician.
Vincenzo Fardella, 93, Italian Olympic ice hockey player.
Margit Feldman, 90, Hungarian-American educator, activist, and Holocaust survivor, COVID-19.
John Forester, 90, American industrial engineer and cycling activist.
Ed Genson, 78, American attorney (R. Kelly, Rod Blagojevich, Conrad Black), bile duct cancer.
William H. Gerdts, 91, American art historian, COVID-19.
Michael Gilkes, 86, Guyanese writer, COVID-19.
Judith Innes, 78, American planning theorist, lymphoma.
Jon Kilgore, 76, American football player (Los Angeles Rams).
Cyril Lawrence, 99, English footballer (Rochdale, Wrexham), COVID-19.
John Lee, 92, British politician, MP (1966–1970, 1974–1979).
Barry Mason, 72, British lutenist and guitarist.
Kerstin Meyer, 92, Swedish mezzo-soprano.
Aldo di Cillo Pagotto, 70, Brazilian Roman Catholic prelate, Bishop of Sobral (1998–2004) and Archbishop of Paraíba (2004–2016), COVID-19.
Dean Parker, 72, New Zealand screenwriter, journalist and political commentator.
Luis Parodi, 83, Ecuadorian engineer and politician, Vice President (1988–1992).
Igor Petrov, 86, Russian naval officer and academic.
Peter Phoenix, 83, English footballer (Oldham Athletic, Rochdale, Stockport County).
Ignacio Pichardo Pagaza, 84, Mexican politician, Governor of the State of Mexico (1989–1993) and President of the Institutional Revolutionary Party (1994), complications from surgery.
Markus Raetz, 78, Swiss painter, sculptor, and illustrator.
C. S. Rao, 84, Indian screenwriter (Pranam Khareedu, Sarada Ramudu).
Gordon Ropp, 87, American politician.
Sir Hugh Rossi, 92, British politician, MP (1966–1992) and Minister for Social Security (1981–1983).
Namık Kemal Şentürk, 97, Turkish politician.
Maria de Sousa, 80, Portuguese immunologist, COVID-19.
Hank Steinbrenner, 63, American sports executive, co-owner of the New York Yankees (since 2008), liver ailment.
Ella King Russell Torrey, 94, American human rights activist, COVID-19.
Jimmy Webb, 62, American clothing stylist and merchandiser (Trash and Vaudeville), cancer.
Peter Whiteside, 67, British Olympic modern pentathlete (1980), COVID-19.
Billy Wright, 89, English footballer (Blackpool, Leicester City).
Ron Wylie, 86, Scottish football player (Notts County, Aston Villa, Birmingham City) and manager.
Kenny Young, 79, American songwriter ("Under the Boardwalk", "Ai No Corrida", "Captain of Your Ship"), producer and environmentalist, cancer.

15
Adam Alsing, 51, Swedish television and radio presenter (Big Brother, Adam Live, Mix Megapol), COVID-19.
Sean Arnold, 79, English actor (Grange Hill, Bergerac).
Barbara Assoon, 91, Trinidadian actress.
Ülkü Azrak, 86, Turkish lawyer and academic, COVID-19.
John Briggs, 90, American politician, California State Assemblyman (1967–1977) and State Senator (1977–1981).
Joe Brown, 89, English mountaineer.
John Buchanan, 86, American Episcopal bishop of West Missouri (1990–1999).
Ranjit Chowdhry, 64, Indian actor (Bollywood/Hollywood, Last Holiday, The Office), complications from a ruptured ulcer.
Eddie Cooley, 87, American songwriter ("Fever") and singer ("Priscilla").
Allen Daviau, 77, American cinematographer (E.T. the Extra-Terrestrial, The Color Purple, Empire of the Sun), COVID-19.
Willie Davis, 85, American Hall of Fame football player (Cleveland Browns, Green Bay Packers).
Bernard Deconinck, 83, French track cyclist, amateur world motor-paced silver medallist (1959).
Brian Dennehy, 81, American actor (First Blood, Death of a Salesman, Silverado), Tony winner (1999, 2003), cardiac arrest due to sepsis.
James Doyle, 87, Canadian politician.
Rubem Fonseca, 94, Brazilian fiction writer.
James Foort, 98, Canadian inventor and artist.
Dámaso García, 63, Dominican baseball player (Toronto Blue Jays, Montreal Expos) and footballer (national team).
Lee Gates, 82, American blues guitarist, singer and songwriter.
Henry Grimes, 84, American jazz musician, COVID-19.
Dries Holten, 84, Dutch singer-songwriter.
Sir John Houghton, 88, Welsh atmospheric physicist, COVID-19.
Dick Hyde, 91, American baseball player (Washington Senators, Baltimore Orioles).
Milena Jelinek, 84, Czech-American screenwriter (Forgotten Light), COVID-19.
Lee Konitz, 92, American jazz composer and alto saxophonist, COVID-19.
Finau Mara, 60, Fijian diplomat and politician, Ambassador-at-large (since 2001).
Alfonso Marquez, 82, Filipino Olympic basketball player (1960, 1968).
Gary McSpadden, 77, American gospel singer (The Imperials, Gaither Vocal Band), pastor and television host, pancreatic cancer.
Eric Mergenthaler, 56, Mexican Olympic sailor (1984, 1988, 1992), and world champion (1992), bicycle accident.
Aldo Mongiano, 100, Italian-born Brazilian Roman Catholic prelate, Bishop of Roraima (1979–1996), complications from a broken femur.
Gérard Mulumba Kalemba, 82, Congolese Roman Catholic prelate, Bishop of Mweka (1989–2017), COVID-19.
Bruce Myers, 78, British actor (The Unbearable Lightness of Being, Let There Be Light), comedian, and director, COVID-19.
Stephanie Neuman, 88, American political scientist, spinal cancer.
John Pfahl, 81, American photographer, COVID-19.
Ann Sayer, 83, English long-distance walker and rower.
Shahin Shahablou, 56, Iranian photographer, COVID-19.
Siamak Shayeghi, 65, Iranian film director and producer, cancer.
George Curtis Smith, 84, American jurist, Judge of the U.S. District Court for Southern Ohio (since 1987).
Vesa Törnroos, 37, Finnish Olympic sports shooter (2016), cancer.
Dorick M. Wright, 74, Belizean Roman Catholic prelate, Bishop of Belize City-Belmopan (2006–2017).
Rustam Zakirov, 30, Kyrgyz footballer (FC Abdysh-Ata Kant, FC Alga Bishkek).

16
Srilal Abeykoon, 66, Sri Lankan actor and singer (Kopi Kade).
Abdennour Abrous, 85, Algerian politician.
Joseph Adler, 79, American theatre and film director (Scream, Baby, Scream).
Rosemary De Angelis, 86, American actress (Law & Order, Frequency, The Juror).
Christophe, 74, French singer-songwriter ("Aline"), COPD.
Gene Deitch, 95, American-born Czech illustrator, animator (Munro, Tom Terrific, Nudnik) and comics artist.
Francesco Di Carlo, 79, Italian mobster (Sicilian Mafia) and pentito, COVID-19.
Andrew J. Fenady, 91, American screenwriter, producer, and actor (Stakeout on Dope Street, The Young Captives).
Howard Finkel, 69, American Hall of Fame professional wrestling ring announcer (WWE).
Luiz Alfredo Garcia-Roza, 83, Brazilian professor and writer.
Kenneth Gilbert, 88, Canadian harpsichordist, organist and music educator.
Victor Hendrix, 84, German Olympic rower (1960).
Danièle Hoffman-Rispal, 68, French politician, Deputy (2002–2012).
Walter Hoover, 85, American Olympic rower (1952).
Jane Dee Hull, 84, American politician, Governor of Arizona (1997–2003) and Secretary of State (1995–1997).
Herbert Jones, 91, Welsh footballer (Wrexham).
Bashir Khanbhai, 74, Tanzanian-born British politician.
Ulrich Kienzle, 83, German author and journalist (ARD, ZDF).
Brian Kyme, 84, Australian Anglican prelate, Assistant Bishop of Perth (1982–1999), cancer.
Santiago Lanzuela, 71, Spanish politician, President of the Government of Aragon (1995–1999), COVID-19.
Jean-Marie Luton, 77, French aerospace engineer, Director General of the European Space Agency (1990–1997).
Althea McNish, 95, Trinidadian-British textile designer.
Henry Miller, 89, American lawyer and jurist, COVID-19.
Bojana Milošević, 54, Serbian-Yugoslavian basketball player, Olympic silver medallist (1988).
Bruce Murray, 90, Australian footballer (South Melbourne) and cricketer (Victoria).
Arne Nilsen, 96, Norwegian politician, Minister of Local Government (1978–1979) and Social Affairs (1979–1981).
William Pulgram, 99, Austrian-born American architect.
Ben Raimondi, 95, American football player (New York Yankees).
Tal Rutledge, 91, American civil rights activist.
Luis Sepúlveda, 70, Chilean writer and journalist, COVID-19.
Shamardal, 18, American-bred British racehorse and sire.
Glider Ushñahua, 51, Peruvian lawyer and politician, Congressman (2016–2019), pneumonia.
Jack Wallace, 86, American actor (Death Wish, Eagleheart, Boogie Nights).
Bohumír Zháňal, 88, Czech Olympic athlete (1960).

17
Bennie G. Adkins, 86, American army Green Beret and intelligence sergeant major, Medal of Honor recipient, COVID-19.
Barney Ales, 85, American record label executive (Motown).
Annette Auguste, 79–80, Haitian folk singer and activist.
Deirdre Bair, 84, American writer and biographer, heart failure.
Jean-François Bazin, 77, French politician and writer.
Carlos Contreras, 81, Chilean footballer (Universidad de Chile, national team).
Georges Cukierman, 93, French resistance member and communist activist.
Paolo Curcetti, 83, Italian Olympic boxer (1960).
Filipe Duarte, 46, Portuguese actor (Belmonte, Variações, Amor de Mãe), heart attack.
George Curtis, 96, English greyhound trainer.
Sergio Fantoni, 89, Italian actor (Von Ryan's Express, Esther and the King, The Manageress).
Mohiuddin Faroque, 79, Bangladeshi art director. 
Gilbert Garcin, 90, French photographer.
Ali Suleman Habib, 63, Pakistani businessman, Chairman of Toyota Indus (since 2009).
Allan Heyl, South African bank robber (Stander Gang).
Norman Hunter, 76, English football player (Leeds United, Bristol City, national team) and manager, world champion (1966), COVID-19.
Patricia Kailis, 86, Australian businesswoman, geneticist and neurologist.
Abba Kyari, 67, Nigerian politician, Chief of Staff to the President (since 2015), COVID-19.
Giuseppi Logan, 84, American jazz musician, COVID-19.
Domenico Lo Vasco, 91, Italian politician.
Iris Love, 86, American archaeologist and dog breeder, COVID-19.
Lukman Niode, 56, Indonesian Olympic swimmer (1984), COVID-19.
Hezakiah Oshutapik, 63, Canadian politician, MLA (2011–2013), heart attack.
Max Quackenbush, 91, Canadian ice hockey player (Chicago Blackhawks, Boston Bruins).
Arlene Saunders, 89, American operatic soprano, COVID-19.
Matthew Seligman, 64, English new wave bassist (The Soft Boys, Thompson Twins), complications from COVID-19.
Robin Seymour, 94, American disc jockey (CKLW, WKNR) and television host (Swingin' Time, Teen Town).
Gene Shay, 85, American disc jockey (WXPN), co-founder of Philadelphia Folk Festival, COVID-19.
Daya Thennakoon, 79, Sri Lankan actor (Visidela, Bambaru Avith).
Sir Alan Traill, 84, British businessman, Lord Mayor of London (1984–1985).
Raymond Van Gestel, 90, Belgian footballer (K. Lyra, Verbroedering Geel, national team).
Jesús Vaquero, 70, Spanish neurosurgeon, COVID-19.
Bobby Winkles, 90, American Hall of Fame baseball coach (Arizona State Sun Devils) and manager (California Angels, Oakland Athletics).
Tommy Woods, 86, American politician, Mississippi state representative (1988–2012).

18
Takuo Aoyagi, 84, Japanese engineer and inventor (pulse oximetry).
Barbara A. Babcock, 81, American legal scholar, cancer.
Erik Belfrage, 74, Swedish diplomat and banking executive, COVID-19.
Aurelio Campa, 86, Spanish footballer (Real Madrid).
Ratnakar Chaini, 74, Indian writer and academic.
Virender Lal Chopra, 83, Indian geneticist and agronomist, director-general of the Indian Council of Agricultural Research (1992–1994).
Albert Côté, 93, Canadian politician.
Sue Davies, 87, British gallery director (The Photographers' Gallery).
Amparo Dávila, 92, Mexican writer.
Terry Doran, 80, British music manager (Grapefruit).
Gulshan Ewing, 92, Indian journalist, COVID-19.
William Foley, 93, American painter.
Jim Fraser, 83, American football player (Denver Broncos), COVID-19.
Gangchen Tulku Rinpoche, 78, Tibetan Buddhist monk, COVID-19.
Allan Gotlieb, 92, Canadian public servant, Ambassador to the United States (1981–1989), cancer and Parkinson's disease.
Eva Konrad Hawkins, 90, Hungarian-born American biologist, COVID-19.
Loïc Hennekinne, 79, French diplomat and government official.
Lennart Jirlow, 83, Swedish painter and scenographer.
Tariq Pervez Khan, 72, Pakistani judge, Chief Justice of the Peshawar High Court.
Sékou Kourouma, 63–64, Guinean politician and political aide, Chief of Staff to President Alpha Condé, COVID-19.
François Lafortune Jr., 87, Belgian rifle shooter, seven-time Olympic competitor (1952–1976), Parkinson's disease.
Helen M. Laird, 89, Scottish electron microscopist.
Bob Lazier, 81, American racing driver (CART), COVID-19.
Jack Lotz, 86, American professional wrestling referee (WWF) and stuntman (Raging Bull, The Siege), COVID-19.
Lawrence E. Lucas, 86, American Catholic priest.
Edward Millward, 89, Welsh nationalist and educator (Charles, Prince of Wales).
Urano Navarrini, 74, Italian footballer, COVID-19.
Paul H. O'Neill, 84, American politician, Secretary of the Treasury (2001–2002), lung cancer.
Willy Quadackers, 82, Dutch footballer (Fortuna '54, MVV Maastricht, national team).
W. Allyn Rickett, 98, American historian.
Jacques Rosny, 81, French actor (The Tenant, Catherine & Co., L.627), COVID-19.
André Roumieux, 87, French nurse.
Claude Silberzahn, 85, French civil servant, Mayor of Simorre (2001–2014), Director of the Directorate-General for External Security (1989–1993).
Bernice Silver, 106, American puppeteer and activist, complications from COVID-19.
Robert Kimmel Smith, 89, American author.
Lucien Szpiro, 78, French mathematician (Szpiro's conjecture), heart failure.
Emma Weigley, 87, American nutritionist, complications from COVID-19.
Gayraud Wilmore, 98, American historian, writer and theologian.

19
Marat Aleksanian, 70, Armenian politician, Minister of Justice (1996–1998).
Edmond Baraffe, 77, French football player (Toulouse) and manager (Le Touquet).
Peter Beard, 82, American photographer. (body discovered on this date)
Cecil Bødker, 93, Danish writer.
Stanislav Boyadzhiev, 74, Bulgarian Olympic basketball player (1968).
Aileen Carroll, 75, Canadian politician, Minister for International Cooperation (2003–2006).
Steve Dalkowski, 80, American baseball player, character inspiration for Bull Durham and The Scout, COVID-19 and dementia.
Noach Dear, 66, American jurist, New York Supreme Court judge (since 2015), COVID-19.
Hubert Deittert, 79, German politician, MP (1994–2009).
Dickie Dowsett, 88, English footballer (Southend United, Bournemouth, Crystal Palace), complications from dementia.
Peter Dronke, 85, German literary scholar and medievalist.
Tex Earnhardt, 89, American entrepreneur.
Hector Garrido, 92, Argentine-born American comic book artist.
Kevin Gill, 58, English Olympic trap shooter (1992, 1996) and 1990 Commonwealth Games champion.
John A. Gordon, 73, American public official, Deputy Director of the CIA (1997–2000), Under Secretary for Nuclear Security (2000–2002) and Homeland Security Advisor (2003–2004).
Índio, 89, Brazilian footballer (Flamengo, Espanyol, national team).
Sergio Onofre Jarpa, 99, Chilean politician, Senator (1973, 1990–1994) and Minister of the Interior (1983–1985), COVID-19.
Aleksandr Kapto, 87, Ukrainian sociologist and diplomat.
Claude Lafortune, 83, Canadian television presenter, sculptor and costume designer, COVID-19.
Robert Loomis, 93, American book editor, complications from a fall.
Pellom McDaniels, 52, American football player (Philadelphia Eagles, Kansas City Chiefs, Atlanta Falcons).
Harry Müller, 89, German sculptor.
Philippe Nahon, 81, French actor (High Tension, I Stand Alone, Calvaire).
Hiroyuki Nakajo, 74, Japanese Olympic sport shooter (1984).
Bob Oliver, 77, American baseball player (Kansas City Royals, California Angels, Pittsburgh Pirates).
Renzo Ostino, 83, Italian Olympic rower (1960).
Margit Otto-Crépin, 75, German-born French equestrian, Olympic silver medalist (1988).
Sy Rogers, 63, American pastor and ex-gay movement activist, kidney cancer.
Harvey Sabinson, 94, American theatrical press agent.
Delphine Serina, 49, French actress (The Liars, On Guard, Tanguy), cancer.
Milen Tsvetkov, 53, Bulgarian journalist, traffic collision.
Alexander Vustin, 76, Russian composer, pneumonia.
Ian Whitcomb, 78, English singer-songwriter ("You Turn Me On") and author.
Emina Zečaj, 91, Bosnian sevdalinka singer.

20
Heherson Alvarez, 80, Filipino politician, Senator (1987–1998), Congressman (1998–2001), Minister of Agrarian Reform (1986–1987), COVID-19.
Roy Barker, 72, English cricketer (Worcestershire).
Eric Berg, 74, American sculptor.
Richard Boyce, 91, American Anglican bishop, Vicar General of the Diocese of Cascadia (2009–2011).
H. G. Carrillo, 60, American writer and academic, complications from COVID-19.
Peter Caws, 88, British-American philosopher.
Libero Cecchini, 100, Italian architect.
Alan Clough, 87, Australian footballer.
Manuel da Costa, 93, Portuguese Olympic sports shooter (1964).
Mike Curtis, 77, American football player (Baltimore Colts, Seattle Seahawks, Washington Redskins).
Ken Dillen, 81, Canadian politician.
Noureddine Diwa, 83, Tunisian footballer (Stade Tunisien, Limoges, national team).
Claude Evrard, 86, French actor (Circus Angel, If the Sun Never Returns).
Farit Ismeth Emir, 65, Malaysian news anchor (Radio Television Malaysia), lung cancer.
Horacio Fontova, 73, Argentine singer, actor and comedian, cancer.
Marie Rose Guiraud, 75, Ivorian dancer and choreographer.
Zac Henderson, 64, American football player (Philadelphia Eagles).
Cliff Holden, 100, English painter, designer and silk screen printer.
Jimmy Jordan, 75, American football player (New Orleans Saints).
Tom Lester, 81, American actor (Green Acres, Benji, Gordy), complications from Parkinson's disease.
Krystyna Łybacka, 74, Polish politician, Minister of National Education and Sport (2001–2004) and MEP (2014–2019).
Sirio Maccioni, 88, Italian restaurateur and writer, founder of Le Cirque, complications from dementia.
Demas Paulus Mandacan, 45, Indonesian politician, Regent of Manokwari (since 2016), heart attack.
Tom Mulholland, 84, Irish Gaelic footballer (Kilkerley Emmets, Louth, Leinster), COVID-19.
Ronan O'Rahilly, 79, Irish businessman, founder of Radio Caroline, vascular dementia.
Gérard Piouffre, 74, French writer and historian.
Gabriel Retes, 73, Mexican film director (Paper Flowers, Broken Flag, A Sweet Scent of Death).
Manjeet Singh Riyat, 52, British emergency care consultant, COVID-19.
Gertrude Rwakatare, 69, Tanzanian politician, MP (since 2007).
Josep Sala Mañé, 82, Spanish casteller, founder of Castellers de Barcelona, COVID-19.
Don Schultz, 83, American chess expert, presidents of the United States Chess Federation (1996–1999).
Rudratej Singh, 46, Indian businessman, CEO of BMW India (since 2019), cardiac arrest.
Jiří Toman, 81, Czech-born Swiss professor and jurist (International Criminal Tribunal for Rwanda).
Arsen Yegiazarian, 49, Armenian chess grandmaster.

21
Muhammad Afzal, 81, Pakistani Olympic wrestler (1964), COVID-19.
Richard Akinjide, 89, Nigerian jurist, Minister of Justice (1979–1983).
Dame Ingrid Allen, 87, Northern Irish neuropathologist.
Dave Bacuzzi, 79, English football player (Arsenal, Manchester City, Reading) and manager, COVID-19.
Belco Bah, 61–62, Malian politician, member of the National Assembly for Niono, COVID-19.
Koos van den Berg, 77, Dutch politician, MP (1986–2002), COVID-19.
Jerry Bishop, 84, American announcer (Judge Judy), heart disease and kidney failure.
José María Calleja, 64, Spanish journalist, political prisoner and anti-ETA activist, COVID-19.
Ernest Courant, 100, American physicist.
Dimitri Diatchenko, 52, American actor (Chernobyl Diaries, Spider-Man: Shattered Dimensions, The Genius Club), heart attack.
Fang Keli, 81, Chinese New Confucian philosopher.
Richard Fenno, 93, American political scientist.
Philip Foglia, 69, American lawyer and civic activist, advocate for Italian American rights issues, COVID-19.
Tina Girouard, 73, American artist, stroke.
Derek Jones, 35, American rock guitarist (Falling in Reverse).
Abdurrahim El-Keib, 70, Libyan politician, acting Prime Minister (2011–2012), heart attack.
Donald Kennedy, 88, American administrator, president of Stanford University (1980–1992), Commissioner of Food and Drugs (1977–1979), COVID-19.
Eva Kolínská, 79, Czech Olympic canoeist (1960).
Marcel Le Roy, 100, French resistance fighter.
Liu Ping-wei, 67, Taiwanese politician, MLY (1999–2002), oral cancer.
Lewis MacAdams, 75, American conservationist, poet and artist, co-founder of FoLAR, complications from Parkinson's disease.
Norm Nielsen, 86, American magician.
Teruyuki Okazaki, 88, Japanese karate master, founder of the International Shotokan Karate Federation, COVID-19.
Jacques Pellen, 63, French jazz guitarist, COVID-19.
Gerson Peres, 88, Brazilian politician, lawyer and journalist, Vice Governor of Pará (1979–1983), member of the Chamber of Deputies (1983–2003, 2007–2011), COVID-19.
Laisenia Qarase, 79, Fijian politician, Prime Minister (2000–2001, 2001–2006).
Teresa Rodrigo, 93, Spanish scientist (CERN, Fermilab).
Joel Rogosin, 87, American television producer (The Virginian, Ironside, Magnum, P.I.), COVID-19.
Florian Schneider, 73, German electronic musician (Kraftwerk), cancer.
Anthony Senecal, 78, American butler (Mar-a-Lago) and politician, Mayor of Martinsburg, West Virginia (1990–1992).
Sharadchandra Shankar Shrikhande, 102, Indian mathematician, developer of Shrikhande graph.
Milt Sunde, 78, American football player (Minnesota Vikings), complications from Parkinson's and Alzheimer's diseases.
Jack Taylor, 84, American politician, member of the Colorado Senate (2000–2008) and House of Representatives (1992–2000), COVID-19.
Miguel Ángel Troitiño, 72–73, Spanish geographer, COVID-19.
Alan Williams, 84, British writer.
Esteban Yáñez, 35, Spanish actor, musician and blogger, COVID-19.
Shōmei Yokouchi, 78, Japanese politician, MP (1993–2002) and Governor of Yamanashi Prefecture (2007–2015).

22
Sir Eric Anderson, 83, British educator, Headmaster (1980–1994) and Provost (2000–2009) of Eton College.
Bootsie Barnes, 82, American jazz saxophonist, COVID-19.
Wilfried de Beauclair, 108, Swiss-born German engineer.
Zarbeg Beriashvili, 80, Georgian Olympic wrestler (1964, 1968).
Sid Bishop, 86, English footballer (Leyton Orient).
Dennis Copps, 91, British-born New Zealand cricket umpire.
Marco D'Amico, 84, American mobster.
Dave Fleming, 76, American CFL football player (Hamilton Tiger-Cats).
Samantha Fox, 69, American pornographic film actress, cardiovascular illness related to COVID-19.
Terence Frisby, 87, English playwright (There's a Girl in My Soup) and actor.
Hartwig Gauder, 65, German race walker, Olympic champion (1980), heart attack and kidney failure.
Jimmy Goodfellow, 76, English football player (Workington, Rotherham United) and manager (Cardiff City).
Oliver Gough, 84, Irish hurler (Rathnure, Wexford, Kilkenny).
Louis Haché, 95, Canadian writer (Acadian literature).
Rich Hacker, 72, American baseball player (Montreal Expos) and coach (St. Louis Cardinals, Toronto Blue Jays), leukemia.
James Hoggan, 61, Australian Paralympic athlete.
Saadat Husain, 73, Bangladeshi civil servant, Chairman of the Public Service Commission (2007–2011), kidney disease.
Bart Johnson, 70, American baseball player (Chicago White Sox), complications from Parkinson's disease.
Sir Peter Jonas, 73, British arts administrator and opera director.
Mansour Khalid, 89, Sudanese politician, Foreign Minister (1971–1975, 1977).
Shirley Knight, 83, American actress (The Dark at the Top of the Stairs, Sweet Bird of Youth, As Good as It Gets).
Eva Kotthaus, 87, German actress.
Dan Mazzulla, 61, American basketball player and coach, brain cancer.
Marcos Mundstock, 77, Argentine musician, comedian and actor (Les Luthiers), brain tumor.
Zoe Dell Nutter, 104, American dancer, model and philanthropist.
John E. Otto, 81, American administrator, acting Director of the Federal Bureau of Investigation (1987).
Catherine Paysan, 93, French writer.
El Príncipe Gitano, 88, Spanish flamenco singer and actor, COVID-19.
Julian Perry Robinson, 78, British chemist and peace researcher, COVID-19.
Paul Ronty, 91, Canadian ice hockey player (New York Rangers, Boston Bruins).
Edward Winchester, 49, Canadian lightweight rower, world champion (2000).

23
Bruce Allpress, 89, New Zealand actor (Came a Hot Friday, The Lord of the Rings: The Two Towers, The Water Horse: Legend of the Deep), complications from amyotrophic lateral sclerosis.
Al Angrisani, 70, American business consultant and author, complications from COVID-19.
Pahri Azhari, 57, Indonesian politician, Regent of Musi Banyuasin (2008–2015), traffic collision.
Albert Bateman, 95, English footballer (Huddersfield Town).
Jean-Michel Beau, 76, French gendarme (Irish of Vincennes scandal).
James M. Beggs, 94, American businessman, NASA Administrator (1981–1985).
Norbert Blüm, 84, German politician, Federal Minister for Social Affairs and Labour (1982–1998).
Arief Budiman, 79, Indonesian political activist and sociologist.
Heda Čechová, 91, Czech anchorwoman and eventual politician, member of the Czech National Council (1990–1992).
Chen Liangting, 91, Chinese translator.
Lloyd deMause, 88, American sociologist and psychohistorian.
Fred the Godson, 35, American DJ and rapper, COVID-19.
Usha Ganguly, 75, Indian theatre director and actress, founder of Rangakarmee, cardiac arrest.
Peter Gill, 89, English professional golfer, COVID-19.
John Gregory, 95, English orchestra leader.
Sajid Hussain, 29, Pakistani Balochi journalist. (body discovered on this date)
André Iuncker, 86, French Olympic boxer (1960).
Jacques Kazadi, 83, Congolese economist, professor, and politician.
Akira Kume, 96, Japanese actor (The Insect Woman, Tora-san's Sunrise and Sunset, The Resurrection of the Golden Wolf), heart failure.
Terry Lenzner, 80, American lawyer and investigator, pneumonia.
Bernardino Lombao, 81, Spanish athlete and businessman.
Chris Marcus, 40, American college basketball player (Western Kentucky), pulmonary embolism.
Alecos Markides, 77, Cypriot lawyer and politician, MP (1985–1995) and Attorney General (1995–2003).
Patrick Leo McCartie, 94, British Roman Catholic prelate, Bishop of Northampton (1990–2001).
John Murphy, 77, Scottish footballer (Ayr United).
Kumiko Okae, 63, Japanese actress and television presenter, COVID-19.
Henk Overgoor, 75, Dutch footballer (Go Ahead Eagles, De Graafschap), COVID-19.
Charles Poots, 90, Northern Irish unionist politician, delegate to the Northern Ireland Constitutional Convention (1975–1976).
Johnny Pyeatt, 86, American football player (Denver Broncos).
Doug Robson, 77, English footballer (Darlington F.C.).
Marvin Schick, 85, American political consultant and professor, heart attack.
Janusz Symonides, 82, Polish diplomat, writer and jurist.
Dan Walters, 53, American baseball player (San Diego Padres), complications of gunshot and traffic collision.
Ernst Zägel, 84, German footballer (1. FC Saarbrücken, Saarland national team).

24
Sir James Adams, 87, British diplomat, ambassador to Tunisia (1984–1987) and Egypt (1987–1992).
Helene Aldwinckle, 99, English codebreaker.
Ebrahim Amini, 94, Iranian politician, member of the Assembly of Experts (1983–2007, since 2016).
Mark Beech, 60, British music critic, complications from a traffic collision.
Hamilton Bohannon, 78, American percussionist, songwriter and record producer.
Phil Broadhurst, 70, New Zealand jazz musician, composer and radio presenter.
David Daniels, 86, American conductor and author.
Lynn Faulds Wood, 72, Scottish television presenter (Watchdog) and journalist, stroke.
Leo Goodstadt, 82, British-Hong Kong economist, Head of the Central Policy Unit (1989–1997).
Grandma Lee, 85, American stand-up comedian.
Roland Haché, 72, Canadian politician, MLA (1999–2014) and mayor of Petit-Rocher (1995–1999).
Richard Hake, 51, American radio journalist (WNYC).
Abdullah al-Hamid, 69, Saudi Arabian poet and human rights activist, co-founder of the Saudi Civil and Political Rights Association, stroke.
Namio Harukawa, 72, Japanese fetish artist, cancer.
Tiede Herrema, 99, Dutch businessman.
Mike Huckaby, 54, American deep house and trance DJ, complications from stroke and COVID-19.
Ray Jarvis, 73, American baseball player (Boston Red Sox).
Mustafa Koçak, Turkish political prisoner, self-imposed starvation.
John Lisnik, 73, American politician, Maine state representative (1980–1990).
Mircea Mureșan, 91, Romanian film director (Răscoala, Blestemul pământului, blestemul iubirii).
Ki Daophet Nouhouang, 47, Laotian singer.
Yukio Okamoto, 74, Japanese diplomat and diplomatic analyst, COVID-19.
Joseph S. Pulver Sr., 64, American writer, COPD.
Burton Rose, 77, American nephrologist, COVID-19.
Yaakov Schwei, 85, American Orthodox rabbi.
Harry Sindle, 90, American Olympic sailor.
Gerald Slater, 86, American television executive, COVID-19.
Taneko Suzuki, 93, Japanese biochemist and nutritionist, colorectal cancer.
Roger Tattersall, 68, English cricketer (Lancashire).
Nic Tummers, 92, Dutch politician, Senator (1974–1995).
Graeme Watson, 75, Australian cricketer (national team), cancer.
Lee Roy West, 90, American jurist, Judge (since 1979) and Chief Judge (1993–1994) of the U.S. District Court for Western Oklahoma.
Don Woan, 92, English footballer (Liverpool).

25
Alan Abel, 91, American percussionist and music educator, COVID-19.
India Adams, 93, American singer and actress.
James B. Adams, 93, American politician and government official, Associate Director of the FBI (1973–1979).
Doug Anakin, 89, Canadian bobsledder, Olympic champion (1964).
Khandaker Asaduzzaman, 84, Bangladeshi politician, MP (1996–2001, 2008–2014), heart disease.
Erin Babcock, 38, Canadian politician, MLA (2015–2019), uterine cancer.
Vytautas Barkauskas, 89, Lithuanian composer.
Peter Brancazio, 81, American sports scientist, COVID-19.
Ricardo Brennand, 92, Brazilian building materials executive, real estate investor and art collector, founder of Ricardo Brennand Institute, COVID-19.
Marino Casem, 85, American Hall of Fame football coach and administrator (Alcorn State, Southern).
Richard Divila, 74, Brazilian motorsports designer, technical director of Fittipaldi Automotive (1975–1982).
Liz Edgar, 76, British showjumper, cancer.
Per Olov Enquist, 85, Swedish author (The Visit of the Royal Physician), cancer.
Erwan Evenou, 80, French writer and activist for the Breton language.
Dick Frey, 90, American football player (Houston Oilers).
Hansadutta Swami, 78, German-born American Gaudiya Vaishnava spiritual leader.
Thomas Huang, 83, Chinese-born American computer scientist.
Henri Kichka, 94, Belgian Holocaust survivor, COVID-19.
Kim Chungyum, 96, South Korean diplomat and politician, Minister of Finance (1966) and Industry (1967–1969), Chief of Staff to the President (1969–1979).
Devanand Konwar, 77, Indian politician, Governor of West Bengal (2009–2010), Bihar (2009–2013) and Tripura (2013–2014).
Madeline Kripke, 76, American book collector, COVID-19.
Mahendra Kumar, 47, Indian political activist (Bajrang Dal), heart attack.
Maurice LeClair, 92, Canadian physician, businessman, civil servant and academic.
Robert Mandell, 90, American conductor, COVID-19.
Robert Mezey, 85, American poet, pneumonia.
Pat Nowlan, 88, Canadian politician.
Karin Priester, 78, German historian and professor.
Jack Scroby, 83, English rugby union and rugby league player (Bradford Bulls, Halifax) and coach (Huddersfield Giants).
Gunnar Seijbold, 65, Swedish photographer, COVID-19.
Abdulkarim Shah, 58, Tanzanian politician, MP.
Les Stevens, 69, English boxer.
Ravi Vallathol, 67, Indian actor (Mathilukal, Godfather, Dada Sahib).
Rosemarie Wright, 88, English pianist.
Yevgeny Yuryev, 69, Russian military officer and politician, commander of the 5th Air and Air Defence Forces Army (2001–2006).
Zarina, 82, Indian-born American artist.

26
Emilio Allué, 85, Spanish-born American Roman Catholic prelate, Auxiliary Bishop of Boston (1996–2010), COVID-19.
Georges-Jean Arnaud, 91, French author.
Tomás Balcázar, 88, Mexican footballer (Guadalajara, national team).
Brian Barclay, 82, Australian footballer (Fitzroy).
Laura Bernal, 64, Argentine diplomat (ambassador to Ireland), COVID-19.
Lorna Breen, 49, American physician, suicide.
Big Al Carson, 66, American blues singer, complications from heart attack.
Giulietto Chiesa, 79, Italian journalist and politician, MEP (2004–2009).
Guillermo Chifflet, 93, Uruguayan journalist and politician, Deputy (1989–2005) and co-founder of Frente Amplio.
Tom Cross, 88, Australian Olympic fencer (1956).
Conrad Dehn, 93, British barrister.
Miquéias Fernandes, 69, Brazilian politician, COVID-19.
Aarón Hernán, 89, Mexican actor (The Garden of Aunt Isabel, Apolinar, Deathstalker and the Warriors from Hell).
Peter H. Hunt, 81, American theatre, film and television director (1776, Give 'em Hell, Harry!), complications from Parkinson's disease.
Kauko Juhantalo, 77, Finnish politician, Minister of Trade and Industry (1991–1992), MP (1979–1993, 1995–1999, 2003–2007, 2015–2019), cancer.
Nick Kotz, 87, American journalist and author, struck by own vehicle.
Tamás Kovács, 79, Hungarian general and prosecutor, Chief Prosecutor of Hungary (2006–2010).
Ron Marlenee, 84, American politician, member of the U.S. House of Representatives (1977–1993).
Otto Mellies, 89, German theatre, film and voice actor (Hellas ohne Götter, According to the Plan, Stopped on Track).
Bijay Mishra, 83, Indian lyricist and screenwriter.
Marcel Ospel, 70, Swiss banker, Chairman of UBS (2001–2008).
Jean-Claude Pertuzé, 70, French comic book artist and illustrator.
Maurice Poli, 86, French actor (Rabid Dogs, Five Dolls for an August Moon, Tom Dollar).
John Ernest Randall, 95, American ichthyologist.
Carlos Regazzoni, 76, Argentine sculptor.
Ray Repp, 77, American singer-songwriter, metastatic melanoma.
Claudio Risi, 71, Italian film director (I ragazzi della 3ª C, Wedding in Paris), complications from a heart attack.
Abolfazl Salabi, 95, Iranian Olympic basketball player (1948).
Badruddin Shaikh, 67, Indian politician, COVID-19.
Paul J. Smith, 88, American artist and curator, director of the Museum of Arts and Design (1963–1979).
Uttam Bandu Tupe, 87, Indian writer and poet.
Henri Weber, 75, French politician, Senator (1995–2004) and MEP (2004–2014), COVID-19.

27
Edean Anderson Ihlanfeldt, 90, American golfer.
Lena Atti, 94, American Yup'ik artisan and craftswoman.
Maryna Bazanova, 57, Russian handball player, Olympic bronze medallist (1988, 1992).
Asdrubal Bentes, 80, Brazilian politician, (1979–1983), member of the Chamber of Deputies for Pará (1987–1991, 1997–1999, 2001–2014), COVID-19.
Eavan Boland, 75, Irish poet, stroke.
Sir Brian Brown, 85, British admiral, Second Sea Lord (1988–1991).
Ian Causley, 79, Australian politician, NSW MP (1984–1996) and MP (1996–2007).
Yves Corbassière, 94, French artist.
Cis Corman, 93, American casting director (Raging Bull, The Deer Hunter, Once Upon a Time in America).
Lam Dorji, 86, Bhutanese military officer, COO of the Royal Bhutan Army (1964–2005).
Joseph Errigo, 81, American politician, member of the New York State Assembly (2000–2010, 2016–2018).
Bernard Gersten, 97, American theatrical producer, pancreatic cancer.
Johannes Gjerdåker, 84, Norwegian historian and translator.
Rollin Glewwe, 86, American politician, member of the Minnesota Senate (1967–1972).
Lynn Harrell, 76, American cellist.
Robert Herbin, 81, French football player (Saint-Étienne, national team) and manager (Strasbourg).
Young Jessie, 83, American R&B singer (The Flairs, The Coasters).
Ramon Jimenez Jr., 64, Filipino advertising executive and politician, Secretary of Tourism (2011–2016).
Moussa Seybou Kassey, 60–61, Nigerien politician.
Jim Keers, 88, English footballer (Darlington).
Yupadee Kobkulboonsiri, 51, Thai-American artist and jewelry designer, COVID-19.
James Mahoney, 62, American pulmonologist and internist, COVID-19.
Mark McNamara, 60, American basketball player (Philadelphia 76ers, San Antonio Spurs, Los Angeles Lakers), heart failure.
Sarah Milledge Nelson, 88, American archaeologist and anthropologist.
Gideon Patt, 87, Israeli politician, member of the Knesset (1970–1996), Minister of Industry (1979–1984) and Tourism (1981, 1988–1992).
Francesco Perrone, 89, Italian Olympic long-distance runner (1960), COVID-19.
Mark Pharaoh, 88, English Olympic athlete.
Jeannette Pilou, 82, Greek soprano.
Barbara Rosiek, 60, Polish writer, poet and clinical psychologist.
Mohammad Shariff, 99, Pakistani admiral, Chief of Naval Staff (1975–1979) and Chairman Joint Chiefs of Staff Committee (1977–1980).
Marty Smith, 63, American motocross racer, dune buggy rollover.
Troy Sneed, 52, American gospel singer, COVID-19.
Chavalit Soemprungsuk, 80, Thai painter and visual artist, National Artist (2014), COVID-19.
Suning Wang, 61, Chinese-born Canadian chemist.
Nur Yerlitaş, 64, Turkish fashion designer, brain cancer.
Dragutin Zelenović, 91, Serbian politician and academic, Prime Minister (1991).

28
Jinnat Ali, 23, Bangladeshi record holder, nation's tallest person, brain tumor.
Michael Anderton, 88, British psychologist and Anglican priest.
Bob Betley, 80, American professional golfer.
David Boe, 84, American organist and pedagogue, COVID-19.
Louis Cardiet, 77, French footballer (Stade Rennais, Paris Saint-Germain, national team).
Jamilur Reza Choudhury, 76, Bangladeshi engineer and educationist, Vice-Chancellor of BRACU (2001–2010) and UAP (since 2012), heart attack.
Luigi De Rosso, 84, Italian Olympic racewalker (1960).
Marc Garanger, 84, French photographer.
Jill Gascoine, 83, British actress (The Gentle Touch, C.A.T.S. Eyes, The Onedin Line), Alzheimer's disease.
Georgianna Glose, 74, American nun and activist, complications from COVID-19.
Phillip Harth, 94, American literary scholar.
Ladislav Hejdánek, 92, Czech philosopher and political dissident (Charter 77).
Alfred Kronig, 91, Swiss Olympic cross-country skier.
Bobby Lewis, 95, American singer ("Tossin' and Turnin'"), pneumonia.
Gil Loescher, 75, American political scientist, heart failure.
Paul Marks, 93, American oncologist and academic administrator, President of the Memorial Sloan Kettering Cancer Center (1980–1999), pulmonary fibrosis and lung cancer.
Bobby Martin, 32, American football player born with no legs, ATV accident.
Robert May, Baron May of Oxford, 84, Australian scientist (Chaos theory), Chief Scientific Advisor to the UK Government (1995–2000) and President of Royal Society (2000–2005).
Steven I. Milligram, 66, American judge, justice of the New York Supreme Court (since 2019), COVID-19.
Mary Ellen Moylan, 94, American ballet dancer.
David Mudd, 86, British journalist and politician, MP (1970–1992).
Ed Napoleon, 82, American baseball player and coach, pneumonia and cancer.
Silas Silvius Njiru, 91, Kenyan Roman Catholic prelate, Bishop of Meru (1976–2004), COVID-19.
Eddy Pieters Graafland, 86, Dutch football player (Ajax, Feyenoord, national team) and manager.
Augustino Ramadhani, 74, Tanzanian jurist and religious leader.
Vajira Ranaweera, 51, Sri Lankan cricketer (Sri Lanka Police Sports Club).
Brian Richardson, 87, Australian cricketer (Tasmania).
Michael Robinson, 61, English footballer (Brighton & Hove Albion, Liverpool, Republic of Ireland national team) and sports commentator, melanoma.
Syahrul, 59, Indonesian politician, mayor of Tanjung Pinang (since 2018), COVID-19.
Mari Winsor, 70, American pilates instructor, amyotrophic lateral sclerosis.
Keith Yandell, 81, American  philosopher of religion.

29
Hema Bharali, 101, Indian independence activist and social worker.
Philippe Breton, 83, French Roman Catholic prelate, Bishop of Aire et Dax (2002–2012).
Germano Celant, 79, Italian art historian, curator and critic, COVID-19.
Trevor Cherry, 72, English footballer (Leeds United, Huddersfield Town, national team).
Giacomo dalla Torre del Tempio di Sanguinetto, 75, Italian Prince and Grand Master of the Sovereign Military Order of Malta (since 2018).
Harold R. DeMoss Jr., 89, American jurist, Judge of the U.S. Court of Appeals for the Fifth Circuit (1991–2015).
Al Edwards, 83, American politician, member of the Texas House of Representatives (1978–2007, 2009–2011).
Alexander Fernando, 79, Sri Lankan actor (Ahas Gauwa, Christhu Charithaya, Supiri Balawatha).
Lenora Garfinkel, 89, American architect, COVID-19.
Allan Gauden, 75, English footballer (Sunderland).
Denis Goldberg, 87, South African lawyer and political activist (Rivonia Trial), lung cancer.
Yahya Hassan, 24, Danish poet.
Todd Hodne, 61, American football player and criminal, cancer.
Ji Chaozhu, 90, Chinese diplomat and politician, Ambassador to Fiji (1985–1987) and United Kingdom (1987–1991).
Irrfan Khan, 53, Indian actor (Slumdog Millionaire, Life of Pi, The Lunchbox), neuroendocrine cancer.
Leonid Komogorov, 92, Russian diplomat, Soviet ambassador to Mauritania (1986–1990).
John Lafia, 63, American screenwriter (Child's Play), suicide by hanging.
Martin Lovett, 93, English cellist (Amadeus Quartet).
Dick Lucas, 86, American football player (Philadelphia Eagles), COVID-19.
Jānis Lūsis, 80, Latvian Hall of Fame javelin thrower, Olympic champion (1968), silver medallist (1972) and bronze medallist  (1964), cancer.
Naziha Mestaoui, 44–45, Belgian artist.
Guido Münch, 98, Mexican astronomer and astrophysicist.
Zoe Mungin, 30, American writer and teacher, COVID-19.
Richard Ndassa, 61, Tanzanian politician, MP (since 1995), COVID-19.
Robert L. Park, 89, American physicist.
Binta Pilote, 71–72, Guinean pilot.
Erich Schriever, 95, Swiss rower, Olympic silver medallist (1948).
Matty Simmons, 93, American magazine publisher (National Lampoon) and film producer (Animal House, National Lampoon's Vacation).
Maj Sjöwall, 84, Swedish author (Martin Beck).
Stezo, 51, American rapper.
Gerson Victalino, 60, Brazilian Olympic basketball player (1984, 1988, 1992).
Noel Walsh, 84, Irish Gaelic footballer, manager and Gaelic games administrator, pneumonia resulting from COVID-19.
Xie Bingcan, 85, Chinese-born American tai chi practitioner.
Roger Westman, 80, English architect.
Stefano Zacchetti, 51, Italian academic.

30
Mouzawar Abdallah, 78–79, Comorian politician.
Suleiman Adamu, Nigerian politician, member of the Nasarawa State House of Assembly, COVID-19.
Ranu Devi Adhikari, 83, Nepali singer.
Aloysius Ahearn, 94, American politician, Connecticut state representative (1975–1977, 1979–1981).
Tony Allen, 79, Nigerian drummer (Fela Kuti, The Good, the Bad & the Queen, Rocket Juice & the Moon), ruptured aneurysm.
John Bryant, 76, British journalist and newspaper editor (The Daily Telegraph, The European, The Sunday Correspondent).
Óscar Chávez, 85, Mexican singer, songwriter and actor, COVID-19.
Jordan Cox, 27, English rugby league player (Hull Kingston Rovers, Warrington Wolves, Doncaster), accidental drug overdose.
Wally K. Daly, 79, English writer.
Howard M. Fish, 96, American Air Force lieutenant general.
Chuni Goswami, 82, Indian footballer (Mohun Bagan, national team) and cricketer (Bengal), cardiac arrest.
Alyce Chenault Gullattee, 91, American psychiatrist and addiction specialist, COVID-19.
Jootje Gozal, 84, Indonesian Olympic sprinter (1956, 1960).
William Haddad, 91, American political lobbyist, heart failure.
BJ Hogg, 65, Northern Irish actor (Give My Head Peace, City of Ember, Your Highness).
Kundanika Kapadia, 93, Indian novelist.
Rishi Kapoor, 67, Indian actor (Bobby, Do Dooni Chaar, Kapoor & Sons).
Michael Keenan, 80, American actor (Picket Fences, Dallas, Complete Works).
Frederick Kroesen, 97, American Army general.
Deepak Lal, 80, Indian economist.
Sam Lloyd, 56, American actor (Scrubs, Galaxy Quest) and musician (The Blanks), heart failure and complications from lung cancer.
Jean-Marc Manducher, 71, French sports executive (Oyonnax Rugby), COVID-19.
Bong Osorio, 66, Filipino media executive and communication professor.
Manuel Vieira Pinto, 96, Portuguese-born Mozambican Roman Catholic prelate, Bishop and Archbishop of Nampula (1967–2000).
André Pomarat, 89, French actor and director.
Billy Ringrose, 89, Irish Olympic equestrian (1956, 1960).
Dzhenko Sabev, 72, Bulgarian Olympic equestrian (1980).
George Trilling, 89, American physicist.
Sylvie Vincent, 79, Canadian anthropologist, COVID-19.
Yu Lihua, 88, Chinese-American writer, COVID-19.
Gerhard Zebrowski, 80, German footballer (SV Werder Bremen, OSC Bremerhaven).

References

2020-04
 04